Laurel Thatcher Ulrich (born July 11, 1938) is a Pulitzer Prize-winning American historian specializing in early America and the history of women, and a professor at Harvard University. Her approach to history has been described as a tribute to "the silent work of ordinary people"—an approach that, in her words, aims to "show the interconnection between public events and private experience." Ulrich has also been a MacArthur Genius Grant recipient. Her most famous book, “A Midwife’s Tale,” was later the basis for a PBS documentary film.

Early life and education
Laurel Thatcher was born July 11, 1938, in Sugar City, Idaho, to John Kenneth Thatcher, schoolteacher and superintendent as well as state legislator and farmer; and Alice Siddoway Thatcher. She graduated from the University of Utah, majoring in English and journalism, and gave the valedictory speech at commencement.

In 1971, she earned a master's degree in English at Simmons College, and subsequently a doctorate in history from the University of New Hampshire, in 1980.

Career
After completing her Ph.D., Ulrich joined the faculty at the University of New Hampshire, gradually working her way up from graduate assistant to tenured faculty member. She remained on the faculty at UNH through 1995.  In 1991, Ulrich received both the Pulitzer Prize and the Bancroft Prize for her work of history, A Midwife's Tale. In 1992, the MacArthur Foundation chose Ulrich as a MacArthur Fellow.

In 1995 she became James Duncan Phillips Professor of Early American History, and director of the Charles Warren Center of Studies in American History, at Harvard University.  She was elected to the American Philosophical Society in 2003. She also served as President of the American Historical Association from 2009 to 2010, and of the Mormon History Association from 2014 to 2015.  As of 2018, Ulrich is 300th Anniversary University Professor, Emerita at Harvard.

Famed quote
In a 1976 scholarly article about little-studied Puritan funeral services, Ulrich included the phrase "well-behaved women seldom make history." In its original iteration, Ulrich meant the quote to indicate that well-behaved women should make history, not to encourage women to rebel or be less well-behaved. The phrase was taken out of context and picked up and soon went viral, being widely quoted and printed across the country. It continues to be seen on greeting cards, T-shirts, mugs, plaques, and bumper stickers. She recounted how her now-famous quote has taken on a life of its own in an October 2007 interview: "It was a weird escape into popular culture. I got constant e-mails about it, and I thought it was humorous. Then I started looking at where it was coming from. Once I turned up as a character in a novel—and a tennis star from India wore the T-shirt at Wimbledon. It seemed like a teaching moment—and so I wrote a book using the title." Well-Behaved Women examines the ways in which women shaped history, citing examples from the lives of Rosa Parks, Christine de Pizan, Elizabeth Cady Stanton, Harriet Tubman, and Virginia Woolf.

A Midwife's Tale

A Midwife's Tale examines the life of Northern New England midwife Martha Ballard, and provides a vivid examination of ordinary life in the early American republic, including the role of women in the household and local market economy, the nature of marriage and sexual relations, aspects of medical practice, and the prevalence of violence and crime. In this book, Ulrich effectively and simultaneously builds historical knowledge of the colonial world and Martha Ballard's biography.

Ulrich's revelatory history was honored with the Pulitzer Prize. A Midwife's Tale also received the Bancroft Prize (prompting a speech by Ulrich which compares her own diary and life to Ballard's), the John H. Dunning Prize, the Joan Kelly Memorial Prize, the Berkshire Conference of Women Historians Book Prize, the Society for Historians of the Early Republic Book Prize, the William Henry Welch Medal of the American Association for the History of Medicine, and the New England Historical Association Award. A Midwife's Tale was later developed into a docudrama film for the PBS series American Experience by producer Laurie Kahn-Levitt and director Richard P. Rogers. The film was based upon both Ulrich's book and her archival process, and Ulrich served as a consultant, script collaborator, and narrator. The book also helped her secure a "Genius Grant" from the MacArthur Fellows Program.

The book became a landmark in women's labor history since it provides scholars with rich insights into the life of a lay American rural healer around 1800. It rests not on the observations of outsiders, but on the words of the woman herself. At first glance, Ballard's encoded, repetitive, and quotidian diary often appears trivial, but as Ulrich found, "it is in the very dailiness, the exhaustive, repetitious dailiness, that the real power of Martha Ballard's book lies... For her, living was to be measured in doing." By knitting together "ordinary" sources to produce a meaningful, extraordinary socio-cultural narrative, Ulrich shows how a skilled practitioner functioned within the interstices of the private and public spheres. The book, divided into 10 sections, takes the "dailiness" of Ballard's diary and transforms it into a rich historical source.

A Midwife's Tale was not only methodologically influential for scholars, but also theoretically important. By showing clearly the economic contributions that midwives made to their households and local communities, and demonstrating the organizational skill of multitasking as a source of female empowerment, the book revises the understanding of prescribed gender roles. While A Midwife's Tale is obviously limited in terms of time (1785–1812) and place (rural Maine), it has attracted sustained attention of historians—especially those interested in gender relations and wage-earning, the economic value of domestic labor, and women's work before industrialization. Ulrich invokes these contributions to historical knowledge  in a 2009 interview, stating, “I don’t think anonymous people need to be included in the historical record just because of fairness or justice. Studying them more carefully makes for more accurate history,” highlighting the potential for work like hers on historically non-dominant voices. The book has also been taught as an exemplar of archival and historical work and explored in conjunction with Ulrich's own life as a historian, writer, and activist.

Summary 
The first entry in A Midwife's Tale puts midwifery in a broader medical context within the Kennebec region, beginning to put Ballard's diary in context of other primary sources at the time. This chapter establishes the relationship between doctors and midwives during this time period. Ulrich also introduces the concept of “social medicine” in this chapter, referring to the sharing of information among midwives and doctors. This is evident in midwife manuals that Ulrich cites.

Section 2 shows the separate economy among women in Hallowell. Ulrich describes this economy as facilitated by the 'social webs' of production and consumption.

Section 3 follows an important rape trial in Hallowell. Mrs. Foster accused Judge North of raping her while her husband was away. Historians are able to contrast Martha's account of the trial with Henry Sewall's account. Henry Sewall opposed the Foster's religious beliefs whereas Martha Ballard felt sympathetic toward the Fosters because others judged them for their religious beliefs.

Section 4 is concerned with the three Ballard family marriages which occurred in 1792, in which Ulrich explores the understanding of marriage and sex at this time. The mid-eighteenth century is seen as a turning point in history when children began only then to choose their own partners and Ballard's diary entries support this. It seems as though all the Ballard marriages in 1792 were courtships chosen by the children as opposed to arrangements proposed for economic benefits. Additionally, there is pre-marital sex.

Section 5 details the fifty-three deliveries Ballard performed in 1793. Ulrich emphasizes that an average of one baby a week seems easy, but Martha often sat for weeks doing nothing, and for others, facing multiple births in a short time during poor weather.

1796, the focus of section 6, is a physically taxing year for her and her husband. She is traveling to deliver babies in flea-infested cabins while her husband works in swamps swarming with mosquitos. Their children also have some health issues that year. In November, her husband Ephraim is at muskie-point and all of his instruments were stolen at the outset of a planned extended surveying journey - canceling the trip, he returned five days later. On the same day, consequently (or around the same time), Martha delivered her 600th baby, a milestone. Ephraim's work continues to be difficult. Martha prays for strength to continue faring through her difficult and laborious life.

Section 7 follows the death and autopsy of John Davis, the son of John Vassall Davis in Kennebec. Ulrich fleshes out the significance of Martha Ballard's presence at the autopsy. Ulrich discusses the change later in 1820, a Harvard Medical School professor published a treatise stating that women should no longer be midwives as they are not educated enough to practice medicine.

Section 8 tracks Martha's entries while her husband, Ephraim Ballard, is in jail for debt. During this time, Martha's son, Jonathan, takes over Martha and Ephraim's house. These entries highlight Martha and Jonathan's rocky relationship. Additionally, Martha experiences a pseudo-widowhood during this time, acknowledging Ephraim's role in the household that now must be filled by her son. This entry gives important information regarding jail time in Kennebec, as Ephraim is allowed to continue working during the day and only has to sleep at the jail at night. There is flexibility regarding cases of debt.

Section 9 is centered around a mass murder that occurred in Hallowell. James Purrinton, one of Martha's neighbors, murdered his wife and all of his children but one, who escaped. Martha's entry adds another viewpoint on this historic event. Ulrich writes, “The economy of Martha’s telling contrasts with the more self-conscious narrative published (and probably composed) by Peter Edes, editor of Augusta’s Kennebec Gazette.”

In Section 10, Ulrich discusses the importance of women in field agriculture, as characterized by Martha's garden and her records of the flowers and vegetables she planted in her time. As Martha grows older, her diary recounts fewer births. Ulrich hypothesizes that this decrease in births is due to another midwife taking over Ballard's work.

Other work
In January 2017, Ulrich's book A House Full of Females: Plural Marriage and Women's Rights in Early Mormonism, was released. This text explores Mormon women living in Utah during the 19th century who had entered into plural marriages. Ulrich argues that this system was both complicated and empowering for the women in these relationships.

Personal life
While she was an undergraduate student, she married Gael Ulrich, now emeritus professor of chemical engineering at the University of New Hampshire. Together they had five children: Karl (b. 1960), Melinda (b. 1963), Nathan (b. 1964), Thatcher (b. 1969), and Amy (b. 1975).

Religion
Ulrich self-identifies as an active feminist and Latter-day Saint (Mormon), and has written about her experiences. She also co-edited (with Emma Lou Thayne) All God's Critters Got a Place in the Choir, a collection of essays about the lives of Mormon women. Ulrich was a co-founder, with Claudia Bushman, Judy Dushku, Sue Paxman and others, of Exponent II, an independent publication on the experience of Latter-day Saint women.

In late 1992, Brigham Young University's board of trustees vetoed without comment a BYU proposal to invite Ulrich to address the annual BYU Women's Conference. Ulrich did give addresses at BYU in 2004 and 2006.

At Harvard, Ulrich is actively involved in the Church of Jesus Christ of Latter-day Saints; she is the adviser for the undergraduate Latter-day Saint Student Association and the Latter-day Saint campus club, and teaches an Institute of Religion class.

Publications
Books
A House Full of Females: Plural Marriage and Women's Rights in Early Mormonism, 1835–1870. (2017). Alfred A. Knopf, Inc. 
Well-Behaved Women Seldom Make History. (2007). Alfred A. Knopf, Inc. 
 Editor, Yards and Gates: Gender in Harvard and Radcliffe History. (2004). Palgrave Macmillan, 
 The Age of Homespun: Objects and Stories in the Creation of an American Myth. (2001). Alfred A. Knopf, Inc. 
 All God's Critters Got a Place in the Choir, a collection of essays coauthored with the Utah poet Emma Lou Thayne. (1995). Aspen Books, 
 A Midwife’s Tale: The Life of Martha Ballard based on her diary, 1785–1812. (1990). Alfred A. Knopf, Inc. . Reissued in Vintage paperback, 
 Good Wives: Image and Reality in the Lives of Women in Northern New England, 1650–1750. (1982). Alfred A. Knopf, Inc. . Reissued by Vintage (1991), 

Online articles
 "How Betsy Ross Became Famous" in Common-Place Vol. 8, No. 1 (October 2007), American Antiquarian Society
 "An American Album, 1857", 2009 Presidential Address to the American Historical Association

See also
 Mormon feminism

References

Further reading

External links

 Laurel Thatcher Ulrich, faculty, History Department, Harvard University
 dohistory.org – an online version of Martha Ballard's diary and information about A Midwife's Tale, a joint project of Harvard University and George Mason University
 

1938 births
21st-century American historians
Latter Day Saints from Massachusetts
Feminist historians
Harvard University faculty
Women's historians
Historians of the Latter Day Saint movement
Historians of the United States
Living people
MacArthur Fellows
Microhistorians
National Humanities Medal recipients
People from Madison County, Idaho
Bancroft Prize winners
Pulitzer Prize for History winners
Simmons University alumni
University of New Hampshire alumni
University of Utah alumni
Historians from Idaho
Mormon feminists
Church Educational System instructors
American women historians
Historians of Maine
University of New Hampshire faculty
21st-century American women
Members of the American Philosophical Society